Heino Kiik (14 May 1927 Avinurme – 22 February 2013) was an Estonian writer and journalist.

He studied agronomy at the University of Tartu and the Estonian Agricultural Academy. Later he studied at the Maxim Gorky Literature Institute in Moscow.

Works

 "Metsiku taltsutamine" (1965)
 "Mõedaku eelpäev" (1966)
 "Tondiöömaja" (1970)
 "Taimetark I-III" (1968–1986)
 novel "Arve Jomm" (1971–1990)
 play "Tütarlaps ja teised" (1974)
 "Maailma viljad" (1982–1986)
 "Elupadrik" (1986)
 "Mind armastas jaapanlanna" (I part 1987, II part 1990, III part 1992)
 "Maria Siberimaal" (1988)
 "Aasta 1988" (Tallinn, Õllu 1990)
 ""Kupra" lõhenemine (aasta 1989)" (Tallinn, Õllu 1992)
 "Kirjanike elamu (aasta 1977)" (Tallinn, Õllu 1993)

References

1927 births
2013 deaths
Estonian male novelists
Estonian male short story writers
Estonian dramatists and playwrights
Estonian journalists
20th-century Estonian writers
21st-century Estonian writers
University of Tartu alumni
Estonian University of Life Sciences alumni
People from Mustvee Parish